Terry Cavanagh (born 1984) is an Irish video game designer based in London, England. After studying mathematics at Trinity College in Dublin, Cavanagh worked briefly as a market risk analyst before focusing on game development full-time. Many of his titles share a primitive, minimalist aesthetic. He has created over two dozen games, most notably VVVVVV, Super Hexagon, and Dicey Dungeons. He is credited as a programmer for Alphaland, a platform game by Jonas Kyratzes.

Cavanagh has stated that he prefers the personal nature of independent game development, its smaller scale enabling the personality of the creator to shine through in the final product.

Influences
Cavanagh cites the 1997 Japanese RPG Final Fantasy VII as his favorite game, crediting it as his inspiration for becoming a video game developer. In 2009 Cavanagh named interactive fiction writer Adam Cadre as his favorite developer.

Awards
Cavanagh's game VVVVVV won the 2010 IndieCade Festival in the category of "Fun/Compelling".
In 2014, Cavanagh was named to Forbes' annual "30 Under 30" list in the Games category.
 In 2019, Cavanagh's game Dicey Dungeons won the 2019 IndieCade Grand Jury award.

Games

References

External links

The Escapist interview with Terry Cavanagh
The Spelunky Showlike — Making Generous Games with Terry Cavanagh

1984 births
Indie video game developers
Irish video game designers
Living people
Video game programmers
Irish expatriates in England
Browser game developers